Lela or lila is a type of Malay cannon, used widely in the Nusantara archipelago. They are similar to a lantaka but longer and had larger bore. Lela can be configured as swivel gun, fixed gun, or mounted in a gun carriage. It is the equivalent of European falcon and falconet.

Etymology 
The cannon was named after a heroine of the Malay classic romance story called "Laila Majnun". It seems that the adoption of the word stems from the name given to some particular piece. The customs of naming special cannon was not uncommon in Europe in the early days and also in Nusantara to the recent times. On Malay literature the name is usually coupled with rentaka, as "lela rentaka". It is also called as lilla by the Dutch and lelo in several parts of the archipelago.

Description 

Usually lela are about 100–180 cm long and made from brass or bronze. They are firing 1.13–1.36 kg (2.5 lb–3 lb) round shot with a range of over 360 m. Alternatively they can also be loaded with scattershots (grapeshot or case shot). Malay cannon usually fired stone balls made from boulders of riverbanks, and to lesser extent were cast metal balls from iron or brass. They used lead and tin slugs (called "dadu-dadu") at close quarters, and the case shot were made of stones in a rattan basket. Lela has a bore (caliber) of between 19 and 76.2 mm. Some big lela are double barreled and sometimes one or more miniature meriam kecil were cast on top of their barrel for use if the enemy charged before the gun could be reloaded. Lela rambang or jala rambang is a type of lela, made from brass, with blunderbuss (flared) muzzle which fired slugs or stones. They are also called lela mulut katak (frog-mouthed lela).

Lela always had a tube cast in the back, in which a wooden handle or tiller would be fitted. This tiller is used for aiming the gun. Lela has forked pivot mount (called cagak, cangkak lela, or rangking) with spike underneath to fit it on a ship's rail or the edge of a stockade. For land use they are commonly placed on corners of a fort or stockade, so they could cover alternately two different walls. Often, they have dolphins (metal lugs on top to lift the cannon) but they may be purely ornamental, as they can be picked up without hoisting it with ropes. Compared to European falconet with its history dating back to the 1500s, lela was shorter in range and lighter in weight but excels in ornamentation and design.

Lela also refer to medium to large size Malay cannon. According to Isabella L. Bird, lelah is long and heavy gun made from brass, used for the defense of the stockades behind which the Malays usually fight (apilan and kota mara, or the Malay kubu fortification). They can reach as far as 1000 yards (914 m), and fire 4 pound (1.8 kg) shot.

History 
The origin of gunpowder-based weaponry in Nusantara archipelago can be traced from the late 13th century. The Mongol invasion of Java brought gunpowder technology to java in the form of a cannon (Chinese: 炮—"Pào"). This resulted in eastern-style cetbang which is similar to Chinese cannon. Swivel guns however, only developed in the archipelago because of the close maritime relations of the Nusantara archipelago with the territory of West India after 1460 CE, which brought new types of gunpowder weapons to the archipelago, likely through Arab intermediaries. This weapon seems to be cannon and gun of Ottoman tradition, for example the prangi, which is a breech-loading swivel gun. A new type of cetbang, called the western-style cetbang, was derived from the Turkish prangi. Just like prangi, this cetbang is a breech-loading swivel gun made of bronze or iron, firing single rounds or scattershots (a large number of small bullets).

Earliest lela, just like lantaka, were breech-loaded weapon. This indicated that the cetbang is the direct predecessor of them. Michael Charney (2004) pointed out that early Malay swivel guns were breech-loaded. There is a trend toward muzzle-loading weapons during colonial times. Nevertheless, when Malacca fell to the Portuguese in 1511 CE, both breech-loading and muzzle-loading swivel guns were found and captured by the Portuguese.

De Barros mentions that with the fall of Malacca (1511), Albuquerque captured 3,000 out of 8,000 artillery. Among those, 2,000 were made from brass and the rest from iron, in the style of Portuguese Berço (breech-loading swivel gun). All of the artillery had its proper complement of carriages which could not be rivalled even by Portugal. The cannons found were of various types: esmeril (1/4 to 1/2-pounder swivel gun, probably refers to cetbang or lantaka), falconet (cast bronze swivel gun larger than the esmeril, 1 to 2-pounder), medium saker (long cannon or culverin between a six and a ten pounder, probably refers to meriam), and bombard (short, fat, and heavy cannon). The Malays also has 1 beautiful large cannon sent by the king of Calicut.

Despite having a lot of artillery and firearms, the weapons of Malacca were mostly and mainly purchased from the Javanese and Gujarati, where the Javanese and Gujarati were the operators of the weapons. In the early 16th century, before the Portuguese arrival, the Malays were a people who lacked firearms. The Malay chronicle, Sejarah Melayu, mentioned that in 1509 they do not understand “why bullets killed”, indicating their unfamiliarity with using firearms in battle, if not in ceremony. As recorded in Sejarah Melayu:Setelah datang ke Melaka, maka bertemu, ditembaknya dengan meriam. Maka segala orang Melaka pun hairan, terkejut mendengar bunyi meriam itu. Katanya, "Bunyi apa ini, seperti guruh ini?". Maka meriam itu pun datanglah mengenai orang Melaka, ada yang putus lehernya, ada yang putus tangannya, ada yang panggal pahanya. Maka bertambahlah hairannya orang Melaka melihat fi'il bedil itu. Katanya: "Apa namanya senjata yang bulat itu maka dengan tajamnya maka ia membunuh?"
After (the Portuguese) coming to Malacca, then met (each other), they shot (the city) with cannon. So all the people of Malacca were surprised, shocked to hear the sound of the cannon. They said, "What is this sound, like thunder?". Then the cannon came about the people of Malacca, some lost their necks, some lost their arms, some lost their thighs. The people of Malacca were even more astonished to see the effect of the gun. They said: "What is this weapon called that is round, yet is sharp enough to kill?" Asia Portuguesa by Manuel de Faria y Sousa recorded a similar story, although not as spectacular as described in Sejarah Melayu. The Epic of Hang Tuah narrates a Malaccan expedition to the country of Rum (the Ottoman Empire) to buy bedil (guns) and large meriam (cannons) after their first encounter with the Portuguese in 1509 CE, indicating their shortage of firearms and gunpowder weapons.
In 1600 CE, lela cannons are becoming more common in the archipelago. Several renowned foundries of the region are Terengganu in Malay peninsula, Gresik in Java, and Minangkabau lands of interior Sumatra, at Brunei and Banjarmasin in Borneo, Sulu in Southern Philippines, Makassar in Sulawesi, and Aceh.

Lela is also used in Banjarese fortified raft called kotta mara. The kotta mara can be used as floating battery or as water castle. Rectangular kotta mara can be equipped with 12 lela, while the kotta mara with corner bastions could mount 16 lela.

Lela is mounted on the apilan (gunshield) of Malay war and piratical prahu. Sunting apilan is the name given to two lelas or light guns standing on the gun-shield of a heavy gun.

Lieutnant T.J. Newbold recorded about the Malay pirate prahu:

Brunei was known for its foundries in the 19th century. Brass (alloy of copper and zinc), has always been the preferred metal as it is cheaper and easier to work, compared to iron or the other harder alloy, the bronze. However, bronze (alloy of copper and tin) is much stronger and is therefore more popular for use in making weapons. The process used is cire perdue using terracotta and wax mould.

Bangsamoro (Muslim) of Philippines were still using rentaka and lela during the Philippine–American War of 1899–1902. Rentaka and lela was brought by Malay from Peninsular and Borneo Malay to Southern Philippine. Bangsamoro have then retained the most of the adopted Malay culture relative to the rest of the Philippines.

Gallery

See also 

Cetbang, earlier, 14th century cannon
Rentaka, smaller version of lela
Ekor lotong, swivel gun with monkey tail shape
Apilan and kota mara, structure on Malay ships used for mounting cannon

Note

References 

Naval artillery
Indonesian inventions
Weapons of Indonesia
Weapons of Malaysia
Weapons of Java
Malaysian culture
Indonesian culture
Cannon
Weapons of the Philippines
15th-century military history
16th-century military history
17th-century military history